Lurocalis is a genus of nightjar in the family Caprimulgidae. The species are found in Central and South America.

Taxonomy
The genus Lurocalis was introduced in 1851 by the American ornithologist John Cassin. The type species was designated as Caprimulgus nattereri Temminck, 1822, by George Robert Gray in 1855. This taxon is now considered as a subspecies of the short-tailed nighthawk. The genus name combines the Ancient Greek oura meaning "tail" with kolos meaning "stunted".

The genus contains two species.

References

 
Bird genera
Taxonomy articles created by Polbot